The esterlin is an obsolete netherlandic unit of mass and stands for gram. It also was a unit of mass for gold in France weighing 28 ½ Grain.
The place of the unit in the netherlandic unit-chain was
 1 livre or pond/pound = 2 mark = 16 once = 320 esterlin = 1280 felins = 10240 aß = 1 pond troy of Holland
 1 pond = 320 esterlin = 49.215,18  centigram
In Belgium, it was valid that 1 livre = 1000 esterlin = 1000 gram

References 

Units of mass
Netherlandic studies